The Hillsborough Arts Council is the official Hillsborough, NC Arts Council endorsed by The Town of Hillsborough, NC, the Hillsborough Chamber of Commerce and The North Carolina Arts Council. The Council is incorporated in the state of North Carolina as a 501(c)(3) non-profit organization. Located in Hillsborough, North Carolina the council is a mostly volunteer organization whose primary role is to support the arts and enrich the community through education and by organizing events that feature local artists.

Sponsored community events include Last Fridays, Arts Walk, Parlor Concerts, Educational Programs and the Hillsborough Handmade Parade.

The programs are funded, in part, by grants from the North Carolina Arts Council, the Hillsborough Tourism Board, The Town Of Hillsborough, NC other state funded agencies and by individual donations. This support allows the council to offer numerous arts related educational services, workshops, community events, programs and exhibitions.

The Hillsborough community event ‘Last Fridays’ was founded by members of the Hillsborough Arts Council in 1998. The events are now organized and managed by the volunteer efforts of the Hillsborough Arts Council working with the Town of Hillsborough, NC, The Alliance For Historic Hillsborough, the Orange County Historical Museum, and the Historical Foundation of Hillsborough.

The Hillsborough Arts Council also works with The Hillsborough Chamber of Commerce, community groups, local, state, and national governmental agencies, and other nonprofit arts organizations to meet the arts and cultural needs of the Hillsborough, NC community through a diversity of initiatives and services.

Events 
Art Walk
Educational Programs
Hillsborough Handmade Parade
Last Fridays
Parlor Concerts

Board of directors
Doris Friend, co-chair
David Hays, co-chair
Bill Whitmore, vice chair
Merle Williams, treasurer
Luba Sawczyn, secretary
Neil Stutzer, board member

Hillsborough Arts Council Gallery 
The Hillsborough Arts Council maintains an art Gallery. The Arts Council Gallery offers a venue for emerging and mid-career artists to exhibit and sell their work. A Call for Artists is published annually in mid-winter.  
Exhibition openings coincide with Last Fridays festivities and are free and open to the public.

History of Arts Councils in the United States 

 1949 In Winston-Salem, NC, a group of citizens, already involved in individual arts organizations, recognized the advantages of having one representative body to look after the collective arts interests of the city, and so formed an organization they called The Arts Council of Winston-Salem. This organization today is the oldest continuously active community arts council in the United States.

References 

North Carolina Arts Council
Metro Magazine
Orange County Arts Commission
The Independent Weekly

External links 
Hillsborough Arts Council website
Hillsborough Arts Council website/Gallery
Volunteer Match
Last Fridays
Historical Foundation of Hillsborough
Handmade Parade
Chapel Hill Orange County Visitors Bureau

Arts councils of the United States
Non-profit organizations based in North Carolina
Organizations based in Hillsborough, North Carolina